Jones Block may mean:
 Jones Block (Adams, Massachusetts)
 Jones Block (Los Angeles)